Janet R. Jakobsen is a scholar of gender and sexuality. She is Ann Whitney Olin Professor of Women's, Gender and Sexuality Studies at Barnard College and Director of Barnard's Center for Research on Women. She has also been Barnard's Dean for Faculty Diversity and Development.

Biography
Jakobsen received her doctorate from Emory University. She taught at Wesleyan University before moving to Barnard.

Jakobsen's partner was the Wesleyan professor of English and professor of feminist, gender and sexuality studies Christina Crosby, until Crosby's death in 2021. Crosby writes about their life together after Crosby's paralyzing bike accident in her memoir, A Body, Undone: Living on After Great Pain.

Bibliography

Books
Working Alliances and the Politics of Difference: Diversity and Feminist Ethics (Indiana University Press, 1998)
Love the Sin: Sexual Regulation and the Limits of Religious Tolerance with Ann Pellegrini (New York University Press, 2003; Beacon Press, 2004)
ed. Interventions: Activists and Academics Respond to Violence with Elizabeth Castelli (Palgrave Macmillan, 2004)
ed. Secularisms, ed. with Ann Pellegrini (Duke University Press, 2008)

Articles and book chapters
"Queer Is? Queer Does?: Normativity and Resistance," GLQ: A Journal of Lesbian and Gay Studies 4 (1998)
"Family Values and Working Alliances: The Question of Hate and Public Policy," in Welfare Policy: Feminist Critiques, ed. E. Bounds, P. Brubaker and M. Hobgood (Pilgrim Press, 1999)
" 'He Has Wronged America and Women': Bill Clinton's Sexual Conservatism," in Our Monica, Ourselves: The Clinton Affair and the National Interest, eds. Lisa Duggan and Lauren Berlant (New York University Press, 2001)
"Can Homosexuals End Western Civilization as We Know It?: Family Values in a Global Economy," in Queer Globalization/Local Homosexualities, ed. A. Cruz- Malavé and M. Manalansan (New York University Press, 2002)
"Sex and Freedom" with Elizabeth Lapovsky Kennedy in Regulating Sex, ed. E. Bernstein and L. Schaffner (Routledge Press, 2005)
"Different Differences: Theory and the Practice of Women's Studies," in Women's Studies for the Future: Foundations, Interrogations, Politics, ed. Elizabeth Lapovsky Kennedy and Agatha Meryl Beins (Rutgers University Press, 2006)

References

Barnard College faculty
Emory University alumni
LGBT studies academics
Queer theorists
Religion academics
Living people
Year of birth missing (living people)
LGBT academics